The Beauchamp-Proctor, later Proctor-Beauchamp Baronetcy, of Langley Park in the County of Norfolk, is a title in the Baronetage of Great Britain. It was created on 20 February 1745 for the twenty-two-year-old William Beauchamp-Proctor, subsequently Member of Parliament for Middlesex. Born William Beauchamp, he assumed the additional surname of Proctor according to the will of his maternal uncle, George Proctor, of Langley Park, Norfolk. The second Baronet married Mary Palmer, a beauty who was the subject of portraits by George Romney and Benjamin West. The third Baronet was an admiral in the Royal Navy.

The fourth Baronet assumed by Royal licence the surname of Proctor-Beauchamp in lieu of Beauchamp-Proctor in 1852 and served as High Sheriff of Norfolk in 1869. He and his wife Catherine Waldegrave had nine children, including the fifth, sixth and seventh Baronets. The fifth Baronet was involved in a scandalous divorce case with his wife, Lady Violet Jocelyn, and Hugh Watt MP.

The sixth Baronet, Horace George, was a lieutenant-colonel in the Norfolk Regiment and was killed in action at Suvla Bay, Turkey, during the First World War. He was born on 3 November 1856 and had joined the army in 1878. His previous service included a year in Sudan (1885–86), for which he was mentioned in dispatches, an honour he also received during the Second Boer War. He was made a Companion of the Order of the Bath in 1902. Retiring in 1904, he was recommissioned at the start of the First World War, in which his nephew Montague Barclay Granville Proctor-Beauchamp served alongside him as a second lieutenant. They were both killed on 12 August 1915 during an abortive advance. The seventh Baronet, Montagu Proctor-Beauchamp, was a missionary in China and one of the Cambridge Seven.

Two other members of the family may also be mentioned. Edward Beauchamp, second son of Reverend William Henry Beauchamp, second son of the third Baronet, was a Liberal politician and was created a Baronet in his own right in 1911 (see Beauchamp baronets). Edward Halhed Beauchamp, third son of George Edward Beauchamp, second son of the second Baronet, was a captain in the Royal Navy.

Heraldry
Arms: First and fourth, argent, a chevron, between three martlets, sable, for Proctor; second and third, gules, a fess between six billets (three and three barways), or, a canton ermine, for Beauchamp.
Crest: On a mount, vert, a greyhound, sejant, argent, spotted, brown, collared, or.
Motto: Toujours fidele (Always Faithful)
Seat: Langley Park, Norfolk.

Beauchamp-Proctor baronets of Langley Park
Sir William Beauchamp-Proctor, 1st Baronet (1722–1773)
Sir Thomas Beauchamp-Proctor, 2nd Baronet (1756–1827)
Sir William Beauchamp-Proctor, 3rd Baronet (1781–1861)
Sir Thomas William Brograve Proctor-Beauchamp, 4th Baronet (1815–1874)
Sir Reginald William Proctor-Beauchamp, 5th Baronet, CB (1853–1912)
Sir Horace George Proctor-Beauchamp, 6th Baronet (1856–1915)
Sir Montagu Harry Proctor-Beauchamp, 7th Baronet (1860–1939)
Sir Ivor Cuthbert Proctor-Beauchamp, 8th Baronet (1900–1971)
Sir Christopher Radstock Proctor-Beauchamp, 9th Baronet (born 1935)

References

Kidd, Charles, Williamson, David (editors). Debrett's Peerage and Baronetage (1990 edition). New York: St Martin's Press, 1990.

Baronetcies in the Baronetage of Great Britain
1745 establishments in Great Britain